Glenea pseudoindiana is a species of beetle in the family Cerambycidae. It was described by Lin and Yang in 2009.

References

pseudoindiana
Beetles described in 2009